Olavi Granö (27 May 1925 – 19 April 2013) was a Finnish geographer.

In 1984–1994, he was the chancellor of University of Turku.

In 2001, he was awarded with Order of the Cross of Terra Mariana, III class.

References

1925 births
2013 deaths
Finnish geographers
Members of the Royal Swedish Academy of Sciences